Cloudburst Mountain is a summit in British Columbia, Canada.

Description 
The mountain rises alongside Highway 99, also known as the Sea to Sky Highway, approximately midway between Squamish and Whistler. Precipitation runoff from the peak drains west into the Squamish River, and east into the Cheakamus River. Cloudburst Mountain is more notable for its steep rise above local terrain than for its absolute elevation. The mountain's toponym was officially adopted December 12, 1939, by the Geographical Names Board of Canada.

Climate 

Based on the Köppen climate classification, Cloudburst Mountain is located in the marine west coast climate zone of western North America. Most weather fronts originate in the Pacific Ocean, and travel east toward the Coast Mountains where they are forced upward by the range (Orographic lift), causing them to drop their moisture in the form of rain or snowfall. As a result, the Coast Mountains experience high precipitation, especially during the winter months in the form of snowfall. Temperatures in winter can drop below −20 °C with wind chill factors below −30 °C

See also 
 Geography of British Columbia

References

External links
 Cloudburst Mountain: weather forecast
 Cloudburst Mountain (photo): Flickr

One-thousanders of British Columbia
Coast Mountains
Squamish-Lillooet Regional District
Sea-to-Sky Corridor